Nagykáta is a town in , Hungary, about  from Budapest.

Connections
Express trains take 47 minutes to Budapest Keleti railway station
from Nagykáta and stopping trains about 65 minutes.

History
The history of Nagykáta dates back to the 12th century,
when the Pest county branch of the Káta family settled
in the region.

On the outskirts of Nagykáta, at a place called Kenderhalom,
can be found the remains of a village which was the
predecessor of Nagykáta at the time of the Árpád dynasty.

The name Nagykáta appears first at the beginning of the 17th century.

Although the village was destroyed several times under the Turkish
occupation of Hungary, it was always revived. The Káthay family were unable keep up with so many setbacks and could not survive the struggle. Heirless Ferenc Káthay had to sell his remaining estates – even Csekekáta – to Miklós Keglevich in 1663.

When Buda was reoccupied Nagykáta was also marked for destruction, and it did not appear in
the official registers until 1665, but from 1696 the village had an ordained priest again, and the registration of births, marriages death began.

Twin towns – sister cities

Nagykáta is twinned with:
 Alfonsine, Italy
 Negotino, North Macedonia
 Ozun, Romania

Gallery

References

External links 

  in Hungarian
 Street map 

Populated places in Pest County